Nayluisa Jhaylenny Cáceres Acevedo (born 18 November 1999) is a Venezuelan professional footballer who plays as a goalkeeper for Spanish Liga F club Granadilla and the Venezuela women's national team.

Early life
Cáceres was born in Socopó, Barinas.

Club career
Cáceres has played for Zamora FC in Venezuela, for Unión Española de Guayaquil in Ecuador and for UD Granadilla Tenerife in Spain.

International career
Cáceres made her senior debut for Venezuela on 8 April 2021.

References

1999 births
Living people
People from Barinas (state)
Venezuelan women's footballers
Women's association football goalkeepers
UD Granadilla Tenerife players
Segunda Federación (women) players
Primera División (women) players
Venezuela women's international footballers
Venezuelan expatriate women's footballers
Venezuelan expatriate sportspeople in Ecuador
Expatriate women's footballers in Ecuador
Venezuelan expatriate sportspeople in Spain
Expatriate women's footballers in Spain